Francis Eugene Nipher (December 10, 1847 – October 6, 1926) was a United States physicist.

Biography
Francis Eugene Nipher was born in Port Byron, New York on December 10, 1847.

He graduated in 1870 from Iowa State University, where he became assistant in physical science. In 1874, he was appointed professor of physics at Washington University in St. Louis. He organized the second state weather service, that of Missouri, in 1877, and for ten years it was maintained without official support. From 1878 until 1883, he conducted a magnetic survey of Missouri, doing the work under private auspices, and publishing the annual reports in the Transactions of the St. Louis Academy of Sciences. Nipher was a member of scientific societies, and in 1885 became president of the St. Louis Academy of Sciences.

He died at his home in Kirkwood, Missouri on October 6, 1926.

Publications
His publications, including twenty-five papers on physics, were contributed to the American Journal of Science and to transactions of societies. He is also the author of Theory of Magnetic Measurements (New York, 1886).

Notes

References

No. 11, marzo 1918, Electrical Experimenter Science and Invention, pag. 743, can electricity destroy gravitation?, Francis E. Nipher.

1847 births
1926 deaths
American physicists
Physicists from Missouri
Washington University physicists
Scientists from Missouri
Washington University in St. Louis faculty
Iowa State University alumni